Theretra queenslandi is a moth of the family Sphingidae first described by Thomas Pennington Lucas in 1891.

Distribution 
It is known from New South Wales, Queensland in Australia and from Papua-New-Guinea.

Description 
The wingspan is about 60 mm. Adults have light brown forewings with a dark stripe running from the base to the apex. There is a dark dot near the middle of the costa. The hindwings are darker brown.

Biology 
The larvae feed on Dendrocnide excelsa. The early instars are green with a dark straight tail horn, and a pair of blue eye markings on the first abdominal segment. Later instars have two colour forms, green and brown. Both forms have a pair of green and white eyespots, one each side of the first abdominal segment. They have a strong reddish backward curving horn on the last segment. Pupation takes place in a slender, mottled brown pupa.

References

Theretra
Moths described in 1891